The Forward Alliance is a Taiwanese national security and civil defense think tank.

Overview 
They are a national security think tank based in Taipei, Taiwan. 

According to The Guardian the Forward Alliance "advocates for greater awareness of defence issues and national security.”

History 
The Forward Alliance was founded by politician and former special forces soldier Enoch Wu. Wu believes that “The best way to deter military conflict is to demonstrate a credible national will to resist, by combining military readiness with civil preparedness.”

Following the beginning of the 2022 Russian invasion of Ukraine, public participation in training programs run by the Forward Alliance increased greatly.

Operations 
The group runs workshops to train civilians in disaster response and civil defense.

See also 
 Kuma Academy

References

External links

Think tanks based in Taiwan
Civil defense in Taiwan